U-97 may refer to one of the following German submarines:

 , a Type U 93 submarine launched in 1917 and that served in the First World War until accidentally sunk on 20 November 1918 on way to surrender
 During the First World War, Germany also had these submarines with similar names:
 , a Type UB III submarine launched in 1918 and surrendered on 21 November 1918; dumped on beach at Falmouth after explosive trials 1921 and broken up in situ
 , a Type UC III submarine launched in 1918 and surrendered on 22 November 1918; used as an exhibition in the United States; sunk on Lake Michigan on 7 June 1921 by gunfire from 
 , a Type VIIC submarine that served in the Second World War until sunk on 16 June 1943

Submarines of Germany